A Mother's Heart is a 1965 Soviet historical revolutionary film directed by Mark Donskoy. Donskoy was awarded USSR State Prize for the film in 1968.

Plot
The film follows the formative years (1884–1890) of Vladimir Ulyanov growing up in Simbirsk. The film was followed by the sequel, A Mother's Devotion in 1967.

Cast
 Yelena Fadeyeva as Mariya Aleksandrovna Ulyanova, the Mother
 Daniil Sagal as Ilya Nikolayevich Ulyanov, the Father
 Nina Menshikova as Anna
 Gennadi Chertov as Aleksandr
 Rodion Nakhapetov as Vladimir Lenin
 Nina Vilkovskaya as Olga
 Svetlana Balashova as Mariya
 Vitaly Churkin as Fedka 
 Victor Mizin as Gorchilin
 Fyodor Nikitin as	Neklyudov
 Vsevolod Safonov as Ishchersky
 Victor Salin as Lionka
 Yuriy Solomin as Dmitri
 Georgi Yepifantsev as Yelizarov

External links

1965 films
1960s historical drama films
Soviet historical drama films
Russian historical drama films
1960s Russian-language films
Gorky Film Studio films
Soviet black-and-white films
Films directed by Mark Donskoy
Films about Vladimir Lenin
Russian black-and-white films